"Toronto's enterprising One Little Goat Theatre Company" is North America's only theatre company devoted to modern and contemporary "poetic theatre." Founded by poet, playwright and director Adam Seelig in New York City in 2002, and based in Toronto since 2005, the company is distinguished by its provocative approach to international plays. The company takes its name from the ancient Aramaic folk song that traditionally concludes the Passover Seder.

Poetic Theatre 
Producing, developing, and defining "poetic theatre" has been One Little Goat's mandate since the company's inception. While the term is open to interpretation, One Little Goat's Artistic Director, Adam Seelig, outlines key elements of the company's aesthetic in an essay for the Capilano Review entitled "EMERGENSEE: GET HEAD OUT OF ASS: ‘Character’ and Poetic Theatre". These elements include "charactor" (Seelig's term for combining an actor's onstage persona with their offstage nature), the "prism/gap" (between actor and audience), and ambiguity. The essay also traces the influences of Sophocles, Zeami, Luigi Pirandello, Bertolt Brecht, Samuel Beckett, Thomas Bernhard , and others on One Little Goat's dramatic approach.

“Poetic theatre attempts to find clarity through ambiguity. It's not verse theatre or prose theatre or journalistic theatre. It's theatre that treats the text as a score [...] and treats the gap between actor and audience not as an obstacle to bypass, but as a medium through which multiple meanings can emerge. There's a difference between shining a light directly into the audience's eyes, and having it pass through a prism."

One Little Goat's "definition of ‘poetic theatre’ is a work in progress" and the company's artistry is practical before it is theoretical: “doing the plays comes first; theory and definition follow.”

Production history

Music Music Life Death Music: An Absurdical
 World Premiere, 25 May – June 10, 2018, Tarragon Theatre Extra Space, Toronto
 Written, Composed and Directed by Adam Seelig
 With Richard Harte, Sierra Holder, Jennifer Villaverde, Theresa Tova
 Band: Tyler Emond (bass), Joshua Skye Engel (guitar), Lynette Gillis (drums), Adam Seelig (piano/Fender Rhodes)
 Sets & Costumes, Jackie Chau; Lighting Design, Laird MacDonald; Music Direction, Tyler Emond; Stage Manager, Laura Baxter; Assistant Producer, Annie MacKay; Executive Producer, Derrick Chua
Overview: 
An "absurdical" exploring the unexpected dynamics between three generations of family: a grandmother, her daughter, son-in-law and teenage grandson.

Publication: Music Music Life Death Music is published by One Little Goat (Toronto 2018)
 print.  e-book.

Smyth/Williams: An All-Female Staging of the Police Transcript
 World Premiere, March 3–12, 2017, Theatre Passe Muraille Backspace, Toronto
 Verbatim police transcript adapted and directed by Adam Seelig
 With Deborah Drakeford, Kim Nelson, and Lynette Gillis on drums
 Set & Costumes, Jackie Chau; Lighting Design, Laird MacDonald; Sound Design, Tyler Emond; Stage Manager, Robin Munro; Assistant Producer, Hana El Niwairi
Overview: 
On February 7, 2010, Detective Sergeant Jim Smyth of the Ontario Provincial Police interviewed Colonel Russell Williams about his possible connection to multiple crimes, including two rape murders. The crimes had occurred in the Ottawa and Belleville areas close to the home and lakeside cottage Williams shared with his wife and their cat. Williams at the time commanded the Canadian Forces Base at Trenton, the busiest air base in the country (located near Belleville, about 175 km east of Toronto). This was the first, and would end up being the only, time he was called in for questioning. After more than four and a half hours of careful interrogation punctuated by long waits and silences, Williams confessed, going on to describe his crimes in matter-of-fact detail. The entire session of nearly seven and a half hours was videoed and transcribed by the O.P.P. and, after some heavy redactions, posted and published. A mostly verbatim adaptation of the police transcript, performed by two female actors and a drummer, Smyth/Williams confronts the attitudes and norms that enable violence against women, while also challenging the conditions that support war.

Controversy: 
Within a day of its official announcement, two months before opening, Smyth/Williams elicited controversy. An online petition, claiming that One Little Goat Theatre Company was sensationalizing violence against women, eventually garnered over two thousand signatures calling for the show's cancellation, and the National Post published an Op-ed denouncing the production ten days before opening. One Little Goat issued a statement clarifying the company's empathic approach to the material, yet protesters still made an appearance in the theatre lobby on opening night. Theatre critics who saw the production and weighed in on the controversy concluded that Smyth/Williams was performed with respect and sensitivity and did not resort to sensationalism.

PLAY: A (Mini) History of Theatre for Kids
 Since 2016, PLAY has been performed for over 10,000 children in Toronto elementary schools
 Written and Directed by Adam Seelig
 Performers: Rochelle Bulmer, Richard Harte, Jessica Salgueiro
 Set & Costumes, Jackie Chau
Overview: 
Beginning with classic games like tag, PLAY: A (Mini) History of Theatre for Kids introduces elementary school students (grades 1–6) to some of the world's most enduring and innovative games known as "plays". Performed by two actors, PLAY guides young audiences through four periods of drama: 
Prehistoric Theatre (games around the fire)
Ancient Greek Theatre (Antigone by Sophocles)
Japanese Noh (Sekidera Komachi by Zeami)
Modern Theatre (Gertrude Stein, Alfred Jarry, Samuel Beckett)

Ubu Mayor
 World Premiere, September 12–21, 2014, Wychwood Theatre, Toronto
 Written, Composed and Directed by Adam Seelig
 With Michael Dufays, Richard Harte and Astrid Van Wieren 
 Band: Tyler Emond (bass), Jeff Halischuk (drums) and Adam Seelig (piano)
 Sets & Costumes, Jackie Chau; Music Direction, Tyler Emond; Lighting Design, Laird MacDonald; Stage Manager, Sandie Becker; Assistant Producer, Sophia Fabiilli
Overview: Alfred Jarry's merde-filled masterpiece of 1896, Ubu Roi, meets the internationally renowned antics, absurdities and obscenities of Toronto's mayor and brother, Rob and Doug Ford, in One Little Goat's first play to feature live music.
 Ubu Mayor involves a mayor (Ubu) whose wife (Huhu) is having an affair with his older brother (Dudu). Ubu wants Huhu to love him again; Ubu wants what's best for the city; but both his love and political ideals are foiled by brother Dudu's machinations.

Publication: Ubu Mayor: A Harmful Bit of Fun is published by BookThug (Toronto 2014).
Google Books for Ubu Mayor
 for Ubu Mayor
BookThug for Ubu Mayor

The Charge of the Expormidable Moose
 English Language World Premiere, May 10–26, 2013, Tarragon Theatre Extra Space, Toronto
 Written by Quebec visionary Claude Gauvreau, Directed by Adam Seelig, Translated from the French by Ray Ellenwood
 With Hume Baugh, David Christo, Lindsey Clark, Sochi Fried, Ben Irvine, Lindsay Owen Pierre, Jessica Salgueiro
 Sets & Costumes, Jackie Chau; Lighting Design, Laird MacDonald; Sound Design, Thomas Ryder Payne; Stage Manager, Robin Munro; Assistant Producer, Sophia Fabiilli
Overview: Widely considered to be Claude Gauvreau's masterpiece, The Charge of the Expormidable Moose (La Charge de l'orignal épormyable, 1956) revolves around a poet who is envied, plagiarized, mocked and ultimately sacrificed by his fellow housemates – or are they fellow inmates? Playful and surreal, as the play's bizarre title suggests, yet equally poignant and tragic, the play's four acts combine the absurdity of Ionesco with the cruelty of Artaud to create an extraordinary drama.

Publication: The Charge of the Expormidable Moose is published by Exile Editions (Toronto 1996). Act One is available on Google Books.

Like the First Time 
 World Premiere, October 28 – November 13, 2011, Walmer Centre Theatre, Toronto
 Written and Directed by Adam Seelig
 With Elva Mai Hoover, Dov Mickelson, Andrew Moodie, Cathy Murphy, Jessica Salgueiro
 Sets & Costumes, Jackie Chau; Lighting Design, Laird MacDonald; Sound Design, Thomas Ryder Payne; Stage Manager, Christopher Whitlock; Wardrobe Assistant, Alison Ho
Overview: Like the First Time revolves around Fulvia, a woman torn between her current life as a single woman and her past life as a wife and mother. On the one hand there is Marco, her latest lover, while on the other there's Silvio, her former husband, who wants to reclaim her as his wife and mother to their now-teenaged daughter. Complicating all this is the daughter's belief that her mother is long dead. Which direction Fulvia's life will take remains uncertain to the play's very end.

Like the First Time is modeled on Nobel Prize Winner Luigi Pirandello’s 1920 play, Come Prima Meglio di Prima.

Adam Seelig has written Like the First Time without punctuation so that the actors may choose how they emphasize the text. The ample spacing on each page of the script is generated by the vertical alignments of certain words to create a circumscribed "tonal universe" for the dialogue. This marks the first time in the history of dramatic literature that a "drop poem" technique has been used to write an entire script. (Seelig first employed this technique for his poem/novella, Every Day in the Morning (slow).

Publication: Like the First Time is published by BookThug (Toronto 2011). In the spirit of Charles L. Mee the full text is available freely online.

Ritter, Dene, Voss 
 New York Premiere, September 23 – October 10, 2010, La MaMa Experimental Theatre Club (Opening production of La MaMa's 49th season, the last one under the artistic leadership of founder Ellen Stewart)
 By Thomas Bernhard, Directed by Adam Seelig, Translated from the German by Kenneth Northcott and Peter Jansen
 With Shannon Perreault, Maev Beaty and Jordan Pettle
 Sets & Costumes, Jackie Chau; Lighting Design, Kate McKay; Stage Manager, Sandi Becker; Music, Ludwig van Beethoven
Overview: In  Ritter, Dene, Voss (named for the three actors – Ilse Ritter, Kirsten Dene and Gert Voss – who premiered the original 1986 production in German), Thomas Bernhard explores sexual repression and sibling rivalry with characteristic tenacity and wit. The play involves two sisters – both actresses – and their attempts at reintegrating their volatile brother into their home. The brother, a tormented genius (loosely based on last century's great, idiosyncratic philosopher, Ludwig Wittgenstein), has just returned from a mental health institute, complicating the dynamics between the three siblings.
US Premiere, December 6–8, 2007, Trap Door Theatre, Chicago
English Language World Premiere, November 17 – December 3, 2006, Alchemy Theatre, Toronto

Talking Masks (Oedipussy)
 World Premiere, November 13–28, 2009, Walmer Centre Theatre, Toronto
 Written and Directed by Adam Seelig
 With Richard Harte, Jane Miller, Andrew Moodie, Cathy Murphy
 Sets & Costumes, Jackie Chau; Lighting Design, Laird MacDonald; Projections, Jason J Brown; Sound Design, Christopher Stanton; Stage Manager, Wendy Lee; Production Assistant, Ruthie Pytka-Jones
Overview: Talking Masks (Oedipussy) involves a son, two mothers and an absent father who, in exploring the intertwined fates of their family, fuse two of the world's most enduring myths: the tragedy of Oedipus, and the harrowing tale of half-brothers Isaac and Ishmael. What unfolds is a wild progression of rapid-fire interactions that expose as much as they mask about the "characters".

Publication: Talking Masks is published by BookThug (Toronto 2009).

BookThug

Someone is Going to Come
 English Canadian Premiere, March 13–29, 2009, Walmer Centre Theatre, Toronto
 By Jon Fosse, Directed by Adam Seelig, Translated from the Norwegian by Harry Lane and Adam Seelig
 With Michael Blake, Dwight McFee, Stacie Steadman
 Sets & Costumes, Jackie Chau; Lighting Design, Kate McKay; Stage Manager, Wendy Lee; Music, Ludwig van Beethoven
Overview: Jon Fosse's provocative and primal three-person play involving sexual jealousy is featured in a new English translation by University of Guelph Professor Harry Lane, and One Little Goat's Artistic Director, Adam Seelig.  Someone is Going to Come involves a man and a woman who move to an old, run-down house in the middle of nowhere to be alone together. From the beginning, however, they grow anxious that "someone is going to come". And sure enough, someone does come, someone whose presence unleashes hidden jealousies that threaten to shatter the couple's relationship. This all unfolds through Fosse's distinctively austere lyricism.

Antigone : Insurgency
 World Premiere, November 9–25, 2007, Walmer Centre Theatre, Toronto
 Written and Directed by Adam Seelig
 With Richard Harte, Earl Pastko, Cara Ricketts
 Sets & Costumes, Jackie Chau; Lighting Design, Kate McKay; Sound Design, Kathy Zaborsky; Stage Manager, Liz Air
Overview: 
Antigone : Insurgency presents a provocative, post-9/11 reworking of Sophocles' masterpiece from the fifth-century BC. Drawing intriguing parallels between the original Greek tragedy and current global politics, the production explores the socio-political repercussions of combating insurgency.

Radio Plays by Yehuda Amichai
English Language World Premieres, 2003–2006, various venues including the 92nd Street Y and Museum of Jewish Heritage in New York, Miles Nadal JCC in Toronto, and in a podcast for Poetry magazine.

References

External links 
 One Little Goat Theatre Company official website

Theatre companies in Toronto